Johann Lund (Johannes Lundius, 1638–1686) was a Lutheran pastor and Hebraist.
His works on ancient Israelite religion were published posthumously by his son Thomas Lund.

Bibliography

Thomas Lund (ed.)  Oeffentlicher Gottesdienst der alten Hebräer, Schleswig 1695
Thomas Lund (ed.)  Levitischer Hohepriester und Priester, Schleswig 1274

Thomas Lund (ed.)  Ausführliche Beschreibung der Hütte des Stifts, wie auch des ersten und andern Tempels zu Jerusalem, Schleswig 1696
Heinrich Muhlius (ed.), Die alten jüdischen Heiligthümer, Gottesdienste und Gewohnheiten, Hamburg 1711; transl.  J. le Long,  Heiligdommen, godsdiensten, en gewoontens der oude Jooden, Amsterdam 1723.

German Hebraists
1638 births
1686 deaths